Peter Grant (born 5 January 1954) is an Australian sprinter. He competed in the men's 400 metres at the 1976 Summer Olympics.

References

External links
 

1954 births
Living people
Athletes (track and field) at the 1976 Summer Olympics
Australian male sprinters
Australian male hurdlers
Olympic athletes of Australia
Place of birth missing (living people)
20th-century Australian people
21st-century Australian people